Across a Billion Years is a 1969 science fiction novel by American  writer Robert Silverberg.

Plot
Set in the year 2375, it follows Tom Rice, a young archaeologist attached to a two-year dig on the planet of Higby V. He is searching for artifacts belonging to a long-lost and ancient race known simply as The High Ones. Throughout known space, details of this billion-year-old civilization have been uncovered on many planets. What seems like a fairly straightforward expedition becomes a galactic odyssey when an artifact never seen before is discovered. This device hints that perhaps the High Ones are not extinct at all.

References

External links

 Across a Billion Years, by Robert Silverberg, SFReader review

1969 American novels
Novels by Robert Silverberg
1969 science fiction novels
Fiction set in the 24th century
Novels set on fictional planets
Novels about ancient astronauts
Dial Press books